In international finance, a world currency, supranational currency, or global currency is a currency that would be transacted internationally, with no set borders.

History

First European Banknotes (17th century)
The first European banknotes were issued in 1661 by Stockholms Banco. Founded by Johan Palmstruch, it was a predecessor of Sweden's central bank Sveriges Riksbank.

Spanish dollar (17th – 19th centuries)

In the 17th and 18th centuries, the use of silver Spanish dollars or eight-real coins, also known as "pieces of eight" extended from the Spanish territories in the Americas westwards to Asia and eastwards to Europe. This then formed the first worldwide currency. Spain's political supremacy on the world stage, the importance of Spanish commercial routes across the Atlantic and the Pacific, and the coin's quality and purity of silver helped it become internationally accepted for about three centuries. It was legal tender in Spain's Pacific territories of Philippines, Guam and Micronesia, and later in China and other Southeast Asian countries, until the mid-19th century. In the Americas it was legal tender in all of South and Central America (except Brazil) and in the US and Canada until the 19th century. The Spanish dollar was legal tender in the United States until the Coinage Act of 1857. In Europe it was legal tender in the Iberian Peninsula as well as most of Italy including: Milan, the Kingdom of Naples, Sicily and Sardinia, in the Franche-Comté (France), and in the Spanish Netherlands. It was also used in other European states including the Austrian Habsburg territories.

After Mexican Independence in 1821, the Spanish dollar continued to be used in many parts of the Americas, together with the Mexican Peso from the 1860s onward. The Mexican peso, the US dollar, and the Canadian dollar all trace their origins back to the Spanish dollar. The trace also included the use of the caduceus sign ($), also known as the dollar sign.

Sterling
Before 1944, the world reference currency was the United Kingdom's, sterling. The transition between sterling and United States dollar and its impact for central banks was described recently.

U.S. dollar

In the period following the Bretton Woods Conference of 1944, exchange rates around the world were pegged to the United States dollar, which could be exchanged for a fixed amount of gold. This reinforced the dominance of the US dollar as a global currency.

Since the collapse of the fixed exchange rate regime and the gold standard and the institution of floating exchange rates following the Smithsonian Agreement in 1971, most currencies around the world have no longer been pegged to the United States dollar. However, as the United States has the world's largest economy, most international transactions continue to be conducted with the United States dollar, and it has remained the de facto world currency. According to Robert Gilpin in Global Political Economy: Understanding the International Economic Order (2001): "Somewhere between 40 and 60 percent of international financial transactions are denominated in dollars. For decades the dollar has also been the world's principal reserve currency; in 1996, the dollar accounted for approximately two-thirds of the world's foreign exchange reserves", as compared to about one-quarter held in euros (see Reserve Currency).

Some of the world's currencies are still pegged to the dollar. Some countries, such as Ecuador, El Salvador, and Panama, have gone even further and eliminated their own currency (see dollarization) in favor of the United States dollar.

Only two serious challengers to the status of the United States dollar as a world currency have arisen. During the 1980s, the Japanese yen became increasingly used as an international currency, but that usage diminished with the Japanese recession in the 1990s. More recently, the euro has increasingly competed with the United States dollar in international finance.

Euro
The euro inherited its status as a major reserve currency from the German mark (DM) and its contribution to official reserves has increased as banks seek to diversify their reserves and trade in the eurozone expands.

As with the dollar, some of the world's currencies are pegged against the euro. They are usually Eastern European currencies like the Bulgarian lev, plus several west African currencies like the Cape Verdean escudo and the CFA franc. Other European countries, while not being EU members, have adopted the euro due to currency unions with member states, or by unilaterally superseding their own currencies: Andorra, Monaco, Kosovo, Montenegro, San Marino, and Vatican City.

, the euro surpassed the dollar in the combined value of cash in circulation. The value of euro notes in circulation has risen to more than €610 billion, equivalent to US$800 billion at the exchange rates at the time. A 2016 report by the World Trade Organisation shows that the world's energy, food and services trade are made 60% with US dollar and 40% by euro.

Recent proposals (21st century)

Governmental
On 16 March 2009, in connection with the April 2009 G20 summit, Russia called for a supranational reserve currency as part of a reform of the global financial system. In a document containing proposals for the G20 meeting, it suggested that the International Monetary Fund (IMF) (or an Ad Hoc Working Group of G20) should be instructed to carry out specific studies to review the following options:

 Enlargement (diversification) of the list of currencies used as reserve ones, based on agreed measures to promote the development of major regional financial centers. In this context, we should consider possible establishment of specific regional mechanisms which would contribute to reducing volatility of exchange rates of such reserve currencies.
 Introduction of a supra-national reserve currency to be issued by international financial institutions. It seems appropriate to consider the role of IMF in this process and to review the feasibility of and the need for measures to ensure the recognition of SDRs as a "supra-reserve" currency by the whole world community."

On 23 March 2009, Zhou Xiaochuan, then-President of the People's Bank of China, called for a replacement of the US dollar with a different standard using "creative reform of the existing international monetary system towards an international reserve currency," believing it would "significantly reduce the risks of a future crisis and enhance crisis management capability." Zhou suggested that the IMF's special drawing rights (a currency basket then comprising dollars, euros, sterling and yen) could serve as a super-sovereign reserve currency, saying that it would not be easily influenced by the policies of individual countries. Then-US President Barack Obama, however, rejected China's call for a new global currency. He stated, "As far as confidence in the US economy or the dollar, I would just point out that the dollar is extraordinarily strong right now."
At the G8 summit in July 2009, Dmitry Medvedev expressed Russia's desire for a new supranational reserve currency by showing off a coin minted with the words "unity in diversity". The coin, an example of a future world currency, emphasized his call for creating a mix of regional currencies as a way to address the global financial crisis.

On 30 March 2009, at the second South America-Arab League Summit in Qatar, Venezuelan president Hugo Chavez proposed the creation of a petro-currency. It would be backed by the huge oil reserves of oil-producing countries. Chavez's successor, Nicolás Maduro, in 2018 announced the Petro cryptocurrency, but it does not appear to be used as a currency.

Single world currency

An alternative definition of a world or global currency refers to a hypothetical single global currency or supercurrency, as the proposed terra or the DEY (acronym for Dollar Euro Yen), produced and supported by a central bank which is used for all transactions around the world, regardless of the nationality of the entities (individuals, corporations, governments, or other organizations) involved in the transaction. No such official currency currently exists, although non-inflationary current funds such as MXV/UDI (Mexican unidad de inversión) have been used as a model for a General Global Currency (GGC), a principal reserved current fund based on a complex relationship between national currencies.   

Advocates, notably Keynes, of a global currency often argue that such a currency would not suffer from inflation, which, in extreme cases, has had disastrous effects for economies. In addition, many argue that a single global currency would make conducting international business more efficient and would encourage foreign direct investment (FDI).

There are many different variations of the idea, including a possibility that it would be administered by a global central bank that would define its own monetary standard or that it would be on the gold standard. Supporters often point to the euro as an example of a supranational currency successfully implemented by a union of nations with disparate languages, cultures, and economies.

A limited alternative would be a world reserve currency issued by the International Monetary Fund, as an evolution of the existing special drawing rights and used as reserve assets by all national and regional central banks. On 26 March 2009, a UN panel of expert economists called for a new global currency reserve scheme to replace the current US dollar-based system. The panel's report pointed out that the "greatly expanded SDR (special drawing rights), with regular or cyclically adjusted emissions calibrated to the size of reserve accumulations, could contribute to global stability, economic strength and global equity."

Another world currency was proposed to use conceptual currency to aid the transaction between countries. The basic idea is to utilize the balance of trade to cancel out the currency actually needed to trade.

In addition to the idea of a single world currency, some evidence suggests the world may evolve multiple global currencies that exchange on a singular market system. The rise of digital global currencies owned by privately held companies or groups such as Ven suggest that multiple global currencies may offer wider formats for trade as they gain strength and wider acceptance.

WOCU currency, based on the WOCU synthetic global currency quotation derived from a weighted basket of currencies of fiat currency pairs covering the top 20 economies of the world, is planned to be issued and distributed by Unite Global a centralised platform for global real-time payments and settlement.

Difficulties

Limited additional benefit with extra cost
Some economists argue that a single world currency is unnecessary, because the U.S. dollar is providing many of the benefits of a world currency while avoiding some of the costs However, this de facto situation gives the U.S. government additional power over other countries. If the world does not form an optimum currency area, then it would be economically inefficient for the world to share one currency.

Economically incompatible nations
In the present world, nations are not able to work together closely enough to be able to produce and support a common currency. There has to be a high level of trust between different countries before a true world currency could be created. A world currency might even undermine national sovereignty of smaller states.

Wealth redistribution
The interest rate set by the central bank indirectly determines the interest rate customers must pay on their bank loans. This interest rate affects the rate of interest among individuals, investments, and countries. Lending to the poor involves more risk than lending to the rich. As a result of the larger differences in wealth in different areas of the world, a central bank's ability to set interest rates to make the area prosper will be increasingly compromised, since it places wealthiest regions in conflict with the poorest regions in debt.

Usury
Usury – the accumulation of interest on loan principal – is prohibited by the texts of some major religions. In Christianity and Judaism, adherents are forbidden to charge interest to other adherents or to the poor (Leviticus 25:35–38; Deuteronomy 23:19). Islam forbids usury, known in Arabic as riba.

Some religious adherents who oppose the paying of interest are currently able to use banking facilities in their countries which regulate interest. An example of this is the Islamic banking system, which is characterized by a nation's central bank setting interest rates for most other transactions.

See also

 Bancor
 Currency substitution
 Dedollarisation
 Nixon shock
 Digital currency
 List of currencies
 List of circulating currencies
 Monetary hegemony
 Special drawing rights (SDRs)
 WOCU
 World currency unit
 Synthetic currency pair
 Money

References

External links

Global Imbalances and Developing Countries: Remedies for a Failing International Financial System, Jan Joost Teunissen and Age Akkerman (eds.), 2007, downloadable pdf book 
World Currency site .

Foreign exchange market
Economic integration
Economic globalization
International finance
Monetary hegemony
World government